Jan Peacock (born November 6, 1955 in Barrie, Ontario) is a Canadian interdisciplinary artist, curator and writer.

Life
Peacock was born in Barrie, Ontario. She studied at the University of Western Ontario, receiving her BFA in 1978, and went on to the University of California in San Diego for her MFA in 1981. Peacock lives in Halifax, Nova Scotia, where she teaches at NSCAD University.

Writing
Some of her published texts include:
 "Presence" in Point and Shoot: Performance et Photography, 
 "Ready Access" in Public, No 25: Experimentalism (Toronto: Public Access, 2002),
 "Move This" and "4/14/99" (with Paula Levine) in LUX: A Decade of Artists’ Film and Video, ed. Steve Reinke and Tom Taylor (Toronto: YYZ Books, 1998)
 "(in)Script" and "SiRENSONG" in By the Skin of Their Tongues: Artists’ Video Scripts, ed. Nelson Henricks and Steve Reinke (Toronto: YYZ Books, 1996) 
 Corpus Loquendi (Body for Speaking): Body-Centred Video in Halifax 1972- 1982 (Halifax: Dalhousie Art Gallery, 1994).

Collections
Peacock's work is found in international public and private collections, including the National Gallery of Canada, the Museum of Modern Art in New York, and Museum Ludwig in Cologne.

Awards
She has won awards at the Atlantic Film & Video Festival (Best Experimental, 1990) the Chicago International Film & Video Festival (1992), and the Atlanta Film & Video Festival (1997). She is a recipient of the Bell Canada Award and the Canada Council Medal for her contribution to the field of video. Peacock received a Governor General's Award in Visual and Media Arts in 2012.

Selected works
Sirensong, 9 min. (1987)
Nuits Blanches: Dark Days, Sleepless Nights, Voice and Nothing More (1990)
White Wash (1991)
Reader By The Window (1993)
Book of Chairs (1997)
The Road Rises To Meet You

External links
Jan Peacock Website
Vtape: Video Art in Canada
Bell Canada Award

References

1955 births
Canadian video artists
Women video artists
Canadian installation artists
Canadian women artists
Artists from Ontario
People from Barrie
Governor General's Award in Visual and Media Arts winners
Living people
Academic staff of NSCAD University